The 1997 College Football All-America Team is composed of the following All-American Teams: Associated Press, Football Writers Association of America, American Football Coaches Association, Walter Camp Foundation, The Sporting News and Football News.

The College Football All-America Team is an honor given annually to the best American college football players at their respective positions. The original usage of the term All-America seems to have been to such a list selected by football pioneer Walter Camp in the 1890s. The NCAA officially recognizes All-Americans selected by the AP, AFCA, FWAA, TSN, and the WCFF to determine Consensus All-Americans.

Offense

Quarterback
Peyton Manning, Tennessee (AP-1, AFCA, FWAA, WCFF, FN)
Ryan Leaf, Washington State (AP-2, TSN)
Cade McNown, UCLA (AP-3)

Running backs
Ricky Williams, Texas (AP-1, AFCA-Coaches, FWAA-Writers, WCFF, TSN, FN)
Curtis Enis, Penn State (AP-1, FWAA-Writers, WCFF)
Skip Hicks, UCLA (AP-2, AFCA-Coaches, TSN)
Ron Dayne, Wisconsin (FN)
Ahman Green, Nebraska (AP-2)
Tavian Banks, Iowa (AP-3)
Fred Taylor, Florida (AP-3)

Wide receivers
Randy Moss, Marshall (AP-1, AFCA-Coaches, FWAA-Writers, TSN, WCFF, FN)
Jacquez Green, Florida (AP-1, FWAA, WCFF)
Jerome Pathon, Washington (AFCA)
Brian Alford, Purdue (AP-2, FN)
E. G. Green, Florida State (AP-2)
Troy Edwards, Louisiana Tech (AP-3)
Bobby Shaw, California (AP-3)

Tight end
Alonzo Mayes, Oklahoma State (AP-1, AFCA-Coaches, FWAA-Writers, WCFF, TSN)
Jerame Tuman, Michigan (AP-2, FN)
Rufus French, Ole Miss (AP-3)

Guards/tackles
Aaron Taylor, Nebraska  (AP-1, AFCA-Coaches, FWAA-Writers, Walter Camp, TSN, FN)
Alan Faneca, LSU (AP-1, FWAA-Writers, Walter Camp, FN)
Kyle Turley, San Diego State (AP-2, AFCA-Coaches, FWAA-Writers, TSN, FN)
Chad Overhauser, UCLA (AP-1, FWAA-Writers, TSN)
Benji Olson, Washington (AP-1, Walter Camp)
Victor Riley, Auburn (AP-2, AFCA-Coaches)
Matt Stinchcomb, Georgia (AP-3, AFCA-Coaches)
Flozell Adams, Michigan State  (AP-2, Walter Camp)
Rob Murphy, Ohio State (FN)
Tra Thomas, Florida State (AP-2)
Eric Anderson, Nebraska (AP-3)
Jim Bundren, Clemson (AP-3)
Kyle Murphy, Arizona State (AP-3)

Center 
Olin Kreutz, Washington (AP-1, WCFF, TSN, FN)
Kevin Long, Florida State  (AP-3, AFCA-Coaches)
Ben Fricke, Houston (AP-2, FWAA-Writers)

Defense

Linemen
Andre Wadsworth, Florida State (AP-1, AFCA-Coaches, Walter Camp, TSN, FN)
Grant Wistrom, Nebraska (AP-1, AFCA-Coaches, FWAA-Writers, Walter Camp, TSN)
Greg Ellis, North Carolina (AP-1, AFCA-Coaches, Walter Camp, FN)
Jason Peter, Nebraska (AP-1, FWAA-Writers, Walter Camp, TSN)
Glen Steele, Michigan (AP-2, AFCA-Coaches)
Jeremy Staat, Arizona State (AP-2, FWAA-Writers)
Lamanzer Williams, Minnesota (AP-3, FWAA-Writers)
Kailee Wong, Stanford (FN)
Jared DeVries, Iowa (AP-2)
Leonard Little, Tennessee (AP-2)
Leon Bender, Washington State (AP-3)
Ed Chester, Florida (AP-3)
Henry Slay, West Virginia (AP-3)

Linebackers
Andy Katzenmoyer, Ohio State (AP-1, AFCA-Coaches, FWAA-Writers, Walter Camp, FN)
Sam Cowart, Florida State  (AP-1, FWAA-Writers, TSN, FN)
Anthony Simmons, Clemson (AP-1, AFCA-Coaches, TSN, FN)
Brian Simmons, North Carolina (AP-, Walter Camp)
Jamie Duncan, Vanderbilt (AP-2, AFCA-Coaches, FWAA-Writers)
Leonard Little, Tennessee (Walter Camp)
Takeo Spikes, Auburn (AP-2, TSN)
Pat Tillman, Arizona State (AP-2, TSN)
Ron Warner, Kansas  (FN)
Sam Sword, Michigan (AP-2)
Daryl Bush, Florida State (AP-3)
Kivuusama Mays, North Carolina (AP-3)
Ike Reese, Michigan State (AP-3)
Chris Gizzi, Air Force (AP-3)

Backs
Charles Woodson, Michigan (AP-1, AFCA-Coaches, FWAA-Writers, Walter Camp, TSN, FN)
Dré Bly, North Carolina (AP-1, FWAA-Writers, Walter Camp, FN)
Donovin Darius, Syracuse  (AP-1, AFCA-Coaches, TSN)
Brian Lee, Wyoming (AP-1, FWAA-Writers, Walter Camp, FN)
Fred Weary, Florida (AP-2, AFCA-Coaches, Walter Camp, TSN, FN)
Antoine Winfield, Ohio State (AP-2, AFCA-Coaches, FWAA-Writers)
Anthony Poindexter, Virginia (TSN, AP-3)
Marcus Ray, Michigan (AP-2)
Shaun Williams, UCLA (AP-2)
Larry Atkins, UCLA (AP-3)
Kevin Williams, Oklahoma State (AP-3)
Patrick Surtain, Southern Mississippi (AP-3)

Specialists

Placekicker
Martín Gramática, Kansas State (AP-1, FWAA-Writers, TSN, FN)
Chris Sailer, UCLA (AP-2, AFCA-Coaches, WCFF)
Brad Palazzo, Tulane (AP-3)

Punter
Chad Kessler, LSU (AP-1, WCFF, TSN, FN)
Chris Sailer, UCLA (FWAA-Writers)
Shane Lechler, Texas A&M (AP-2)
John Baker, North Texas (AP-3)

All-purpose / kick returners
Tim Dwight, Iowa (AP-All-Purpose-1, AFCA-Coaches, FWAA-Writers, TSN)
Quinton Spotwood, Syracuse (AP-All-Purpose-2)
Kevin Faulk, LSU (AP-All-Purpose-3)

See also
 1997 All-ACC football team
 1997 All-Big 12 Conference football team
 1997 All-Big Ten Conference football team
 1997 All-Pacific-10 Conference football team
 1997 All-SEC football team

References

All-America Team
College Football All-America Teams